Narhar Ambadas Kurundkar (15 July 1932 – 10 February 1982) was a Marathi scholar, critic and writer who wrote on political philosophies in general and cultural matters and historical events in Maharashtra, India.

Kurundkar was born on 15 July 1932 in the town of Nandapur in the Marathwada region of Maharashtra. After his high school education, he joined the City College in Hyderabad. In his first two years in college, he often skipped classes and spent most of his time at the State Library in Hyderabad, voraciously reading books on History, Culture, Religion, philosophy, Education, Literature, Politics, and Economics. Through inattention to preparations for his college examinations, he failed to pass the second-year college examination even after a few attempts, and he quit his pursuit of a college degree (until some years later).

Developing socialist ideas in his mind, Kurundkar became for a while a labour leader of the local rickshaw drivers' union. Later he became, for the rest of his life, an ardent member of Rashtra Seva Dal.

In 1955, he started his teaching career at Pratibha Niketan high school in Nanded. While teaching, he resumed his pursuit of college degrees in Humanities. After earning in 1963 a master's degree from Marathwada University, he joined the faculty of People's College in Nanded as a professor of Marathi. He later became principal of that college. Narhar Kurundkar was conferred with "Best Teachers Award" by Government of Maharashtra in the year 1979.

All of Kurundkar's literary work reflected the idea of supremacy of logical thinking. (He had said that he had imbibed that idea from his father and one of his high school teachers.) Bertrand Russell was his role model: He shared Russell's thinking and reasoning. Besides being a deep thinker and a littérateur, he was a social activist. He was associated with Jayprakash Narayan's Total Revolution; Agitation for the Development of Marathwada; Vinoba Bhave's Teachers' Congress (आचार्य कुल); and the Fear Not movement opposing the dictatorial "national Emergency" imposed in 1975 by the then Indian Prime Minister Indira Gandhi.

Kurundkar was a member of Maharashtra Government Literary Awards Committee. He represented Maharashtra in the Sahitya Akademi, New Delhi.

Kurundkar died due to a heart attack on 10 February 1982 while giving a public speech on Indian music at Aurangabad.

Biography

Acharya Narhar Kurundkar was a multi-faceted, self-nurtured personality, famous in the entire region of Marathwada as Guruji. He strived all his life to appropriately guide the society as an ideal teacher, principal, philosopher, researcher, critic, orator, author and guide. No subject was outside his scope. He had a command over a wide range of topics, from Bharatmuni's NatyaShastra (science of drama) to Freud's human psychology and from Shankaracharya's philosophy of duality to Marxism.

His career in teaching began in 1955 at Pratibha Niketan in Nanded. Later in 1963, he became a professor in People's College in Nanded. He was also the external examiner for research papers on Marathi and Political Science. He gave informal guidance for the research on history, music, Sanskrit, poetry and literature. He efficiently handled the responsibility as a Principal of People's College also.

Guru Bhalchandra Maharaj Kahalekar had a significant role to play in Kurundkar's development. Kahalekar was a Marxist patriot and a professor of Marathi. Kurundkar would gratifyingly say about Kahalekar, 'Rather than what to think, he taught me how to think'. As a thinker, his ideologies and behaviour were influenced by the personalities and writings of such great people as Acharya Javdekar, Mahatma Gandhi, Winston Churchill, Will Durant and Bertrand Russell. Kurundkar was especially influenced by Marxist ideologies. He believed that the foundation of a society is in its wealth. He said 'Materialistic thoughts are always more influential than any other thought'. His thoughts were never merely idealistic and he believed in the practicality of all ideologies. This is why in his book Jaagar, he unmasked the facetious and hypocritical people who talk about progress and idealism, but never walk the talk.

Excellent oration was one among the various roles that Acharya Kurundkar executed. He was known and loved as an inspirational orator among all classes and age groups in society. Like Socrates, he was always surrounded by youth. Some of the most unusual features of his oratory style were his ability to explain a wide variety of the most difficult of subjects in easy simple language, using humour in even the most serious of subjects and keeping the audience attentive by the clever use of wit and sarcasm. Using this style, he enlightened the society on various difficult subjects and thoughts. His writing and oration always followed two main streams: people's perspective &  his own perspective on issues and circumstances.

He was an active member all his life of the Rashtra Seva Dal. Yadunath Thatte's words: ‘Kurundkar had a lion's share in laying the foundation of Rashtra Seva Dal’ gives us an idea of the extent of his contribution to the organisation. Of special significance is Acharya's book titled Vaataa Tuzhyaa Maazhyaa (Paths – yours and mine) written in the form of questions and answers, that served as a tool for public education.

Reading and writing were Acharya Kurundkar's favourite hobbies – they were his life.

His writing gave a new direction to the world of Marathi literature, especially to criticism. His critique on subjects like Marathi stories, novels, poems, drama, thought-provoking literature, light literature, Dalit literature, etc. are milestones in Marathi literature. Acharya Kurundkar's name must be mentioned when talking about criticism of Marathi literature. Roopvedh (1963) is a collection of some of his invaluable freestyle critiques. This publication brought Kurundkar the recognition of best literary work from the government. In Dhaar ani Kaath (Stream and border), published in 1971, Kurundkar has summed up the progress and development of Marathi novels in a comprehensive manner. This book is considered a self-sufficient book for the study of Marathi novels. His Paayvaat (footsteps) published in 1974, contains numerous critiques on different streams of Marathi literature like critique, poems, and drama.

Marathi literature and Acharya Kurundkar have become an inseparable part of each other. He was an active member of the Maharashtra Sahitya Parishad for many years. He was the president of the regional conventions held by the Parishad in Vidharbha, Mumbai and Baroda. He was on the Literary Award Committee of the Government of Maharashtra. At the same time, he was also associated with the activities of organisations like the Sahitya Parishad and National Book Trust as a representative of Maharashtra, especially the Marathwada region.

There were two prevalent streams of thought at the time. One that believed that art should be pure and exist for art itself, while the other believed that art cannot exist in isolation, but has to connect with the society and social life of the times. Kurundkar was a staunch supporter of the later stream. His articles on Dalit literature amply demonstrate this belief. He also believed in the eternal human values which bound him throughout his life in the different roles that he executed. His thoughts on different social issues continue to inspire people to introspect and provoke action. Dalit literature and the Dalit movement were special subjects of study for him. He often provided guidance to the dalit leaders, encouraging them in building their movement. He was of the opinion that there should be an open exchange of thoughts and ideas between people from different walks of life, across class, castes and sub-castes. He strived hard to promote this through his literature and work. His book Bhajan (1981) contains various articles on Dalit literature and the existing social issues in his time. His Manusmruti (1982) intensely highlights the injustice dealt by society on women and dalits. Status of women in society, social and political relationships between Hindu and Muslim were also subjects for study and writing. He was a supporter of the Muslim Satyashodhak movement started by the social worker Hamid Dalwai.

His Shivratra (1970) which elucidates the ill effects of caste based and communal politics is relevant even today.

His method of studying history as a historian is worth learning. He believed that the concepts of nationalism and socialism are complementary. At the same time he was a proponent of democracy. In Chaya Prakash (1975) written during the Emergency, he has expressed his thoughts about democracy and dictatorship.

He opined that it was necessary to study history to completely understand nationalism, socialism and democracy. Though Kurundkar was not an established historian, Kurundkar determinedly and dedicatedly worked towards finding new horizons in the study and research of history. His most important contribution as a historian is his study of the meanings, concepts and processes involved with the changing meanings of words with time. He proved that research is incomplete and unidimensional without an understanding of this process. He gave a new direction to methods of historical research. His historical books are considered a guide for researchers of history today, chief among which are Magova (1967) – a collection of articles on ancient history, Jaagar (1969) – a profound perspective on Indian history, politics, economics, and religion, and Shivrai, a book that reveals the substance of Shivaji Maharaj's life. The foreword written by him for the popular book on Shivaji Maharaj, Shriman Yogi, is worth a mention.

He insisted that it wasn't enough to merely study political history, and promoted the study of cultural and social history, the importance of art, knowledge and other subjects too. He is considered one of the greatest researchers among the select few diligent researchers of the Marathi language who pursued the rediscovery of the past through oriental research. Along with history he was also a researcher of various subjects like philosophy, physiology, religion, finance, sociology and politics.

In a span of just fifty years, Acharya Kurundkar made a valuable contribution to Maharashtra's intellectual world through his exceptional intellect, elocution, knowledge and writing. In Aakalan (1982), Acharya Kurundkar has brought to life the personalities of famous Indian leaders like Mahatma Gandhi, Dr. Ambedkar, Subhashchandra Bose, Sardar Patel, etc., encompassing their social and political work. This book familiarises us with these personalities, as well as the social and political situation in those times. His autobiography Vaatchaal also familiarises us with many contemporary famous personalities.

Till his last breath, Acharya Kurundkar continued the work of public education through his writing, speeches and discussions. Death struck him on a stage in Udgir, just as he was about to commence his speech. Acharya Kurundkar's sudden death at such a young age was a big blow to the intellectual world of Maharashtra. It is indeed a strange quirk of faith that this intellectual was struck by death while on his mission, just like a martyr who is struck by death on the battlefield.

The following translation of a poem written by the senior social worker Baba Amte, eulogising Acharya Kurundkar, says it all:

The field of thoughts that you sowed
Were just sprouting stalks afresh.
And the seeds were barely getting enriched with the milk (of knowledge).
Drawn by the trough filled with this milk
Birds were beginning to flock from all directions;
you collapsed before reaping the harvest of your thoughts.

A lecture series by Kurundkar on Shivaji, the founder of Maratha state is extant and can be accessed here.

Literary work
The following is a list of some of Kurundkar's works.

References

External links
 http://narharkurundkar.com/
 Narhar Kurundkar, L.S.Deshpande, Sahitya AKademy, 2005, 
 Ghate, Pankaj. मी नरहर कुरुंदकरांकडे कसं पाहतो! (पूर्वार्ध) 
 Ghate, Pankaj. मी नरहर कुरुंदकरांकडे कसं पाहतो! (उत्तरार्ध)
 Kurundkar, Madhu, Sangat Narharchi, Sadhana Prakashan, 2018,  संगत नरहरची
 Kulkarni, Tushar.नरहर कुरुंदकर कोण होते आणि त्यांचे विचार आजही लागू होतात का?
 Tejaswini Deo. Our personal loss remained suppressed, unexpressed...

1932 births
1982 deaths
Deaths from myocarditis
Marathi-language writers
People from Marathwada
People from Parbhani district
People from Hingoli district
Political philosophers